Otto (died 26 June 1057) was an illegitimate son of Bernard, Margrave of the Nordmark, and a Slav mistress whose name is unknown. He took the title march and claimed the Northern March following the death in battle of his half-brother William on 10 September 1056. However, he was opposed by Lothair Udo I and killed in battle near Hausneindorf the next summer.

Sources
Medieval Lands Project: Nobility of Brandenburg.

Margraves of the Nordmark
1057 deaths
Year of birth unknown